Valenzuela labrostylus is a species of Psocoptera from Caeciliusidae family that is endemic to Corsica.

References

Caeciliusidae
Insects described in 2002
Psocoptera of Europe
Endemic fauna of Corsica